Kim Yong-il (born 6 July 1994) is a North Korean footballer who plays as a midfielder for Kigwancha and the North Korea national team.

Career
Kim was included in North Korea's squad for the 2019 AFC Asian Cup in the United Arab Emirates.

Career statistics

International

International goals

References

External links
 
 
 
 Kim Yong-il  at WorldFootball.com
 Kim Yong-il at DPRKFootball

1994 births
Living people
Sportspeople from Pyongyang
North Korean footballers
North Korea international footballers
Association football midfielders
Rimyongsu Sports Club players
Footballers at the 2014 Asian Games
Footballers at the 2018 Asian Games
Asian Games medalists in football
Asian Games silver medalists for North Korea
Medalists at the 2014 Asian Games
2019 AFC Asian Cup players
21st-century North Korean people